Constitutive ablation refers to gene expression which results in cell death. Constitutive cell ablation can be induced by diphtheria toxin (DT) in zebrafish.

See also 
Genome
Fatal/harmful mutations

References

External links 

Genetics